A Ministry of Education and Science is a common form of government ministry popular in countries of Eastern Europe. Such bodies generally cover the functions of both a Ministry of Education and a Ministry of Science, overseeing the education of students, and scientific research.

Examples of such ministries include:

Ministry of Education and Sciences (Albania), former name of the Ministry of Education, Sports and Youth
Ministry of Education and Science (Armenia)
Ministry of Education and Science (Bulgaria)
Ministry of Science and Education (Croatia)
Ministry of Education and Science of Georgia
Ministry of Education and Science (Kazakhstan)
Ministry of Education and Science (Lithuania)
Ministry of Education and Science (Macedonia)

Ministry of Education and Science (Russia)
Ministry of Education and Science of Ukraine

See also
List of education ministries
Ministry of Science